The women's wakeboard freestyle competition in water skiing at the 2017 World Games took place from 25 to 27 July 2017 at the Old Odra River in Wrocław, Poland.

Competition format
A total of 12 athletes entered the competition. In semifinals two best athletes qualifies to the final. Athletes who can't qualify through semifinals takes last chance qualifiers, from which the best athlete qualifies to the final.

Results

Semifinals

Heat 1

Heat 2

Last Chance Qualifiers

Heat 1

Heat 2

Final

References 

Water skiing at the 2017 World Games
2017 World Games